The 1910 Missouri Tigers football team was an American football team that represented the University of Missouri in the Missouri Valley Conference (MVC) during the 1910 college football season. The team compiled a 4–2–2 record (2–1–1 against MVC opponents) and outscored all opponents by a combined total of 77 to 17. Bill Hollenback was the head coach for his first and only season. The team played its home games at Rollins Field in Columbia, Missouri.

Schedule

References

Missouri
Missouri Tigers football seasons
Missouri Tigers football